Ulul is a village and municipality in the state of Chuuk, Federated States of Micronesia. An airstrip on Ulul allows regularly scheduled flights by Caroline Islands Air to the capital, Weno. Structures on the island include a school, municipal buildings, residences, and ruins of fortifications built during World War II.

Ulul is the westernmost island of Namonuito Atoll.

References

Municipalities of Chuuk State